Webster's Microcomputer Buyer's Guide is a book written by Tony Webster and published in 1981.

Contents
Webster's Microcomputer Buyer's Guide is a book which contains over 300 pages of computer industry information.

Reception
Gene Allen reviewed the book for Computer Gaming World, and stated that "if you want or need a rapid education about the microcomputer industry, this book will help you at least know the right questions to ask. That in itself could be worth a great deal."

References

1981 non-fiction books
Computer books